Max Glick is a Canadian television comedy-drama series, which aired on CBC Television from 1990 to 1991. Based on the Morley Torgov novel The Outside Chance of Maximilian Glick and its 1988 film adaptation, the series centred on Maximilian Glick, a young Jewish boy coming-of-age in Beausejour, Manitoba in the 1960s. Though set in Beausejour, the series was filmed on location in Vancouver and Agassiz, British Columbia.

Synopsis
The series starred Josh Garbe as Max, Alec Willows and Linda Kash as his parents Henry and Sarah, Jan Rubeš and Susan Douglas Rubeš as his grandparents Augustus and Bryna, Melyssa Ade as his classmate and love interest Celia, and Jason Blicker as Rabbi Teitelman. Jan and Susan Rubeš were the only cast members to reprise their roles from the film; Noam Zylberman, who had played Max in the film, was also originally slated to star in the series, but had undergone puberty and grown too tall to believably play a 13-year-old by the time the series entered production. The series was created by Stephen Foster and Phil Savath, who had been the producer and screenwriter of the original film.

Critics commonly compared the series to the contemporaneous American series The Wonder Years.

Episodes
The series aired 26 episodes over two seasons in the fall of 1990 and 1991, and then aired in reruns in 1992. It was not renewed for a third season.

Season 1 (1990–91)

Season 2 (1991)

Awards
The series received three Gemini Award nominations at the 6th Gemini Awards in 1992, for Best Guest Performance in a Series (Marilyn Lightstone), Best Costume Design (Karen L. Matthews) and Best Original Music Score for a Series (Graeme Coleman); at the 7th Gemini Awards in 1993, Coleman was again nominated for Best Original Music while David Barlow won the award for Best Writing in a Dramatic Series.

References

External links

1990 Canadian television series debuts
1991 Canadian television series endings
1990s Canadian comedy-drama television series
CBC Television original programming
Coming-of-age television shows
English-language television shows
Jewish Canadian culture
Period family drama television series
Television shows filmed in British Columbia
Television shows filmed in Vancouver
Television shows set in Manitoba
Television series about families
Television series about Jews and Judaism
Television series set in 1963
Television series set in 1964
Fictional characters from Manitoba